Gelnai (formerly) is a village in Kėdainiai district municipality, in Kaunas County, in central Lithuania. According to the 2011 census, the village had a population of 47 people.

There is an agroservice, a wayside chapel (cultural heritage object), a cemetery and many wooden sculptures made by local wood carver.

History

In the beginning of the 20th century, there was Gelnai village and zaścianek in Babtai volost.

Demography

Notable people
Bronius Vyšniauskas (1923–2015), Lithuanian sculptor.

Images

References

Villages in Kaunas County
Kėdainiai District Municipality